Ziblim Iddi is a Ghanaian politician and member of the Seventh Parliament of the Fourth Republic of Ghana representing the Gushiegu Constituency in the Northern Region on the ticket of the New Patriotic Party.

References

Ghanaian MPs 2017–2021
1967 births
Living people
Ghanaian Muslims
New Patriotic Party politicians